İsi is a talysh village and municipality in the Masally Rayon of Azerbaijan. It has a population of 186.

References

Populated places in Masally District